Common keelback may refer to several species of colubrid snakes of the subfamily Natricinae:
Tropidonophis mairii — common keelback, Mair's keelback (Australia, New Guinea)
Fowlea flavipunctatus — yellow-spotted keelback (Southeast Asia)
Rhabdophis subminiatus — red-necked keelback (South and Southeast Asia)

References